Sooroojdev Phokeer is a politician and Ambassador from Mauritius who is serving as Speaker of National Assembly of Mauritius. He has been served as Ambassador to the United States from 2015 to 2019 and Ambassador to Egypt during 2001.

References 

Living people
Year of birth missing (living people)
Mauritian politicians of Indian descent
Speakers of the National Assembly (Mauritius)